Ryan Jamar Boatright (born December 27, 1992) is an American-born naturalized Armenian professional basketball player for Avtodor Saratov of the VTB United League. He also represents the Armenian national basketball team. He completed his college career at University of Connecticut in 2015. Boatright was a key player for the Huskies' 2013–14 NCAA Championship team, as he earned 2014 NCAA Final Four All-Tournament team honors.

High school career
Boatright, an Aurora, Illinois native, averaged 31.2 points per game as a senior at East Aurora High School and was named Illinois Co-Mr. Basketball with Chasson Randle.

As a Senior, he once scored 63 points in a game against Proviso West, and another outing scoring 55 against St. Charles North. Boatright also led the charge in defeating and upsetting the undefeated Benet Academy Redwings in the Sectional Semifinals 60–52. Benet was ranked #1 in the State of Illinois, 7th in the Nation with a team that featured Wisconsin bound Frank Kaminsky. Boatright finished with 29 points and 6 assists. He had originally committed to West Virginia, but changed his mind when the Mountaineers signed another point guard just a day later. He then went on and decided to commit to the University of Connecticut.

College career

Freshman year
Upon arriving at Connecticut, his eligibility was challenged. After he missed the first three games, the National Collegiate Athletic Association ruled that he would have to serve an additional three-game suspension to bring his total to six games served due to "receiving improper benefits", consisting of more than $8,000 in cash and other impermissible benefits that he and his mother had received. Upon further review, Boatright's suspension was increased to a total of nine gamesn. Nonetheless, as a freshman he averaged 10.4 points, 4.0 assists and 3.3 rebounds in 30.1 minutes per game.

Sophomore year
Following his return, Boatright along with backcourt teammate Shabazz Napier both rose to the national spotlight as they were highlighted as one of the nation's best backcourts, as they both averaged a combined 33 points and 9 assists per game, outplaying nearly every opponents' backcourt they've played. He kept the momentum up in his sophomore season of 2012–13, raising his scoring average to 15.4. He was named to the USBWA All-District first-team at the conclusion of the season.

Junior year
On April 26, 2013, Boatright opted to return to the team for his junior year along with teammates Shabazz Napier and DeAndre Daniels. Boatright played 39 of UConn's 40 games, starting 38 of them, averaging 12.1 points, 3.4 assists, 1.6 steals and a career-best 3.5 rebounds. He averaged 13.5 points and 5.0 rebounds in the Final Four and was named to the All-Final Four team. He was one of four Huskies to average double-digit point totals in the inaugural American Athletic Conference Tournament. Boatright scored in double-figures in 27 of 39 games and in all six of UConn's NCAA Tournament games. He was second on the team this year with 61 steals, which were the most ever for him in a season.

Boatright's defense was a key factor in the Huskies' drive to the 2014 Final Four.  He was named to the 2014 All-Final Four team and UConn won the national championship.

Senior year

Upon the preseason of the 2014–15 season, Boatright was named the preseason All-American Athletic Conference player of the year and was selected to the preseason first team. Boatright was a unanimous first-team All-American Athletic Conference team selection in 2015. He hit a game winning three against Cincinnati in the AAC Tournament quarter-finals as time expired to win the game 57–54.

College statistics

|-
| style="text-align:left;"| 2011–12
| style="text-align:left;"| Connecticut
| 25 || 8 || 30.1 || .421 || .377 || .690 || 3.3 || 4.0 || 1.2 || .2 || 10.4
|-
| style="text-align:left;"| 2012–13
| style="text-align:left;"| Connecticut
| 30 || 30 || 36.3 || .429 || .333 || .785 || 2.9 || 4.4 || 1.5 || .1 || 15.4
|-
| style="text-align:left;"| 2013–14
| style="text-align:left;"| Connecticut
| 39 || 38 || 32.4 || .391 || .376 || .798 || 3.5 || 3.4 || 1.6 || .2 || 12.1
|-
| style="text-align:left;"| 2014–15
| style="text-align:left;"| Connecticut
| 34 || 34 || 35.8 || .423 || .411 || .850 || 4.1 || 3.8 || 1.4 || .2 || 17.4
|-
| style="text-align:left;"| Career
| style="text-align:left;"| 
| 128 || 110 || 33.8 || .416 || .380 || .794 || 3.5 || 3.8 || 1.4 || .2 || 14.0
|-

Professional career

Grand Rapids Drive (2015–2016)
After going undrafted in the 2015 NBA draft, Boatright signed with the Brooklyn Nets on July 2 and joined the team for the 2015 NBA Summer League. In nine Summer League games for the Nets, Boatright averaged 14.1 points, 2.3 rebounds and 2.2 assists per game. On October 20, 2015, he was waived by the Nets after appearing in four preseason games. 

On October 23, he signed with the Detroit Pistons. He was waived two days later. 

On October 31, he was acquired by the Grand Rapids Drive of the NBA Development League as an affiliate player of the Pistons. On January 21, 2016, he was waived by the Drive.

Orlandina Basket (2016)
On January 26, Boatright signed with Orlandina Basket of the Italian Serie A.

Guangzhou Long-Lions (2016) 
On July 30, 2016, Boatright signed with Guangzhou Long-Lions of the Chinese Basketball Association.

Cedevita Zagreb (2016–2017) 
On November 21, 2016, Boatright signed with Cedevita Zagreb of the Croatian League after leaving China.

Beşiktaş (2017–2018) 
On July 21, 2017, Boatright signed a 1+1 deal with Turkish club Beşiktaş.

Agua Caliente Clippers (2018)
For the 2018–19 season, Boatwright signed with the Agua Caliente Clippers of the NBA G League.

Texas Legends (2018–2019) 
On December 16, 2018, the Texas Legends announced that they had acquired Boatright from the Agua Caliente Clippers.

Unicaga (2019) 
On January 8, 2019, Unicaja announced that they had acquired Boatright. On May 27, 2019, he left the team.

Cedevita Olimpija (2019–2020) 
On July 30, Boatright signed with Cedevita Olimpija of the ABA League. On January 20, 2020, he left the team.

BC Avtodor (2020) 
On January 29, 2020, Boatright signed with BC Avtodor of the VTB United League. He averaged 16 points per game.

Rytas Vilnius (2020–2021) 
On November 8, 2020, Boatright signed with BC Rytas of the Lithuanian Basketball League. On February 27, 2021, he left the team.

Paris Basketball (2021–2022) 
On March 1, 2021, Boatright signed with Paris Basketball of the LNB Pro A.

Second stint with Avtodor Saratov (2022–present) 
On August 31, 2022, he has signed with Avtodor Saratov of the VTB United League.

Personal life
Boatright is the son of Mike McAllister and Tanesha Boatright. He has one brother Michael and two younger sisters Dasia and Deahjay.

References

External links
UConn Huskies bio 

1992 births
Living people
ABA League players
Agua Caliente Clippers players
American expatriate basketball people in China
American expatriate basketball people in Croatia
American expatriate basketball people in Italy
American expatriate basketball people in Slovenia
American expatriate basketball people in Spain
American expatriate basketball people in Turkey
American men's basketball players
Baloncesto Málaga players
Basketball players from Illinois
BC Avtodor Saratov players
Beşiktaş men's basketball players
Grand Rapids Drive players
Guangzhou Loong Lions players
KK Cedevita players
KK Cedevita Olimpija players
Liga ACB players
Orlandina Basket players
Paris Basketball players
Point guards
Sportspeople from Aurora, Illinois
Texas Legends players
UConn Huskies men's basketball players
University of Connecticut alumni